Filipendula multijuga   is a species of plant in the family Rosaceae that is native to Japan.

References

External links
 
 

multijuga
Plants described in 1879